Fabrice N'Guessi Ondama (born 27 February 1988) is a Congolese former professional footballer who played as a winger.

Club career
Ondama was born in Ouenzé, Republic of the Congo

On 2 January 2019, Ondama joined Raja Beni Mellal in Morocco. Later in the same month, he left the club again to join Club Athletic Youssoufia Berrechid.

International career
Ondama earned his first cap for the Congo national team in the 2010 FIFA World Cup qualifying match against Mali on 7 September 2008.

He was selected in Congo's squad for the 2015 Africa Cup of Nations and scored the winning goal in a 2–1 defeat of Burkina Faso, to put the Diables Rouges into the quarter-finals for the first time since 1992.

Career statistics
Scores and results list Congo's goal tally first, score column indicates score after each Ondama goal.

Honours

Stade M'Bombat La Mancha
 Coupe du Congo: runner-up 2006

Wydad Casablanca
 Botola: 2014–15, 2016–17: runner-up 2015–16
 CAF Champions League: runner-up 2011

Individual
 2007 African Youth Championship MVP

References

External links
 
 

1988 births
Living people
Association football forwards
Republic of the Congo footballers
Republic of the Congo international footballers
2015 Africa Cup of Nations players
Saudi Professional League players
Botola players
Tunisian Ligue Professionnelle 1 players
US Créteil-Lusitanos players
Stade Rennais F.C. players
Ittihad FC players
Wydad AC players
CSMD Diables Noirs players
Club Africain players
Republic of the Congo expatriate footballers
Republic of the Congo expatriate sportspeople in Morocco
Expatriate footballers in Morocco
Republic of the Congo expatriate sportspeople in Saudi Arabia
Expatriate footballers in Saudi Arabia
Republic of the Congo expatriate sportspeople in France
Expatriate footballers in France
Republic of the Congo expatriate sportspeople in Tunisia
Expatriate footballers in Tunisia